Marathon–Tula is a Russian UCI track team founded in 2017. After the 2022 Russian invasion of Ukraine, the UCI said that Russian teams are forbidden from competing in international events.

History 
The project was created through the initiative of Alexey Dyumin, governor of the Tula region, and Alexander Vinokurov, president of the investment company Marathon Group, with the aim of supporting and developing Russian cycling. The team's second sponsor since 2018 is VSMPO-AVISMA.

The team's cyclists come from the Tula region as well as other regions of Russia. The team specializes in track disciplines, however its cyclists participate in road races as well

Marathon–Tula became a UCI track team in 2018. Marathon–Tula's cyclists have participated in the events of the UCI Track Cycling World Cup multiple times after having joined the team.

After the 2022 Russian invasion of Ukraine, the UCI said that Russian and Belarusian teams are forbidden from competing in international events.

Team roster

Season 2020

Season 2019

Major results

2017 
UEC European Track Championships, Berlin

— 2nd — elimination race — Maxim Piskunov

2018 
UEC European Track Championships, Glasgow

— 2nd — madison — Diana Klimova (with Gulnaz Badykova)

2017–18 UCI Track Cycling World Cup, Pruszków

— 1st — scratch race — Maria Averina

2019 
European games, Minsk

— 3rd – madison – Diana Klimova (with Maria Novolodskaya)

2020 
2019–20 UCI Track Cycling World Cup, Glasgow

— 3rd – scratch race – Diana Klimova

Russian National Road Race Championships

— 1st – mass start – Diana Klimova

— 3rd – time trial – Tamara Dronova

References

External links 
 Official website

Cycling teams based in Russia
Track cycling teams